

A sex-hormonal agent, also known as a sex-hormone receptor modulator, is a type of hormonal agent which specifically modulates the effects of sex hormones and of their biological targets, the sex hormone receptors. The sex hormones include androgens such as testosterone, estrogens such as estradiol, and progestogens such as progesterone. Sex-hormonal agents may be either steroidal or nonsteroidal in chemical structure and may serve to either enhance, inhibit, or have mixed effects on the function of the sex hormone systems.

Sex-hormonal agents are used in medicine for a variety of purposes including hormone therapy (e.g., menopausal hormone therapy, androgen replacement therapy, transgender hormone therapy), antihormone therapy (e.g., androgen deprivation therapy, estrogen deprivation therapy), and hormonal contraception, among others.

Types and examples

Androgen receptor (AR) modulators

 Androgens and anabolic steroids (AR agonists)
 Examples: testosterone, androstanolone (dihydrotestosterone), prasterone (dehydroepiandrosterone), nandrolone (nortestosterone), methyltestosterone, metandienone (methandrostenolone), oxandrolone, stanozolol, danazol
 Selective androgen receptor modulators (AR mixed agonists/antagonists)
 Examples: enobosarm (ostarine; GTx-024, MK-2866), andarine (GTx-007)
 Antiandrogens (AR antagonists)
 Examples: cyproterone acetate, chlormadinone acetate, spironolactone, flutamide, bicalutamide, enzalutamide, apalutamide

Estrogen receptor (ER) modulators

 Estrogens (ER agonists)
 Examples: estradiol, estrone, estriol, estetrol, conjugated estrogens (Premarin), ethinylestradiol, diethylstilbestrol (stilbestrol), chlorotrianisene
 Selective estrogen receptor modulators (ER mixed agonists/antagonists)
 Examples: tamoxifen, clomifene, cyclofenil, raloxifene, toremifene, lasofoxifene, ospemifene, bazedoxifene
 Antiestrogens (ER antagonists)
 Examples: fulvestrant, ICI-164384, TAS-108 (SR-16234), ZB716 (fulvestrant-3-boronic acid), ethamoxytriphetol (MER-25)

Progesterone receptor (PR) modulators

 Progestogens and progestins (PR agonists)
 Examples: progesterone, medroxyprogesterone acetate, norethisterone (norethindrone), levonorgestrel, drospirenone, dydrogesterone
 Selective progesterone receptor modulators (PR mixed agonists/antagonists)
 Examples: mifepristone, ulipristal acetate, telapristone (CDB-4124), vilaprisan (BAY-1002670)
 Antiprogestogens (PR antagonists)
 Examples: aglepristone, onapristone (ZK-89299)

Indirect sex-hormonal agents
Drugs that indirectly influence sex hormone systems, such as antigonadotropins like GnRH analogues and prolactin releasers (e.g., D2 receptor antagonists), progonadotropins like GnRH agonists, and steroidogenesis inhibitors like aromatase inhibitors and androgen synthesis inhibitors, are also sex-hormonal agents.

See also
 List of investigational sex-hormonal agents

References

Hormonal agents
Sex hormones